Amy Wren (born 14 October 1989) is an English actress.

Personal life 
Wren attended Parsnips Youth Theatre in Harborough for four years. She was featured in the Mail in July 2006, when she and two others from Parsnips were chosen to be a part of the National Youth Theatre.

Career 
Wren started acting when she was talent spotted by Disney UK at the age of 16. She was then engaged for Disney’s comedy sketch show Life Bites, playing the lead role as Chloe. She moved onto working with Nickelodeon in Genie In The House and Summer in Transylvania. In 2010 she appeared in Andrea Arnold's film adaptation of Emily Brontë’s novel Wuthering Heights, in which she played Frances Earnshaw. In 2016 she played Lady Evelyn Herbert in Guy Burt's TV mini-series Tutankhamun which is the story of the archeologist Howard Carter, who discovered the tomb of Tutankhamun.

Filmography

References

External links 
 

English television actresses
1989 births
Living people
English stage actresses
21st-century English actresses
Actresses from Leicestershire
National Youth Theatre members
People with obsessive–compulsive disorder